Somethin' Serious is the 1994 debut solo studio album by American rapper Big Mike of the Geto Boys. It was released in 1994 via Rap-A-Lot Records. Production of the album was handled by N.O. Joe, Troy Clark, Pimp C, John Bido, Mike Dean, Crazy C and Mike B. It also features guest appearances from UGK, Scarface and Mr. 3-2. The album peaked at number 40 on the Billboard 200 chart and at number 4 on the Top R&B/Hip-Hop Albums chart. It launched the charting single "World of Mind", which peaked at number 45 on the Hot Rap Songs chart. Somethin' Serious was certified Gold four months after release, the LP remains Big Mike's only RIAA certification. It was distributed through Rap-A-Lot Records and recorded In Dallas, Tx, Kitchen Studios. It was engineered by Jason Reed, Michael L Gipson and Jp Munchi.

Track listing

Sample credits
Fire
"Fire" by Ohio Players
Havin' Thangs
"Good Old Music" by Funkadelic
Playa Playa
"What a Wonderful Thing Love Is" by Al Green
Smoke 'Em & Choke 'Em
"Goodbye, So Long" by Funk, Inc.
Somethin' Serious
"Outstanding" by The Gap Band
Get Over That
"Funkin' for Jamaica (N.Y.)" by Tom Browne
Southern Thang
"People Say" by The Meters

Personnel
 Michael Barnett – main artist, producer (tracks: 1, 3, 4, 12, 14), mixing, assistant engineering
 Chad Lamont Butler – featured artist & producer (tracks: 6, 14)
 Christopher Juel Barriere – featured artist (track 12)
 Brad Terrence Jordan – featured artist (track 13)
 Bernard Freeman – featured artist (track 14)
 Michael "DJ Domination" Poye – scratches
 Joseph Johnson – producer (tracks: 1-3, 8, 11, 13), mixing
 Troy Clark – producer (tracks: 9, 12), mixing
 Michael George Dean – producer (track 4), mixing, engineering, mastering
 John Okuribido – producer (track 7), mixing
 Simon Cullins – producer (track 5)
 Michael Banks – producer (track 10)
 James A. Smith – executive producer
 John Moran – mastering
 Patrick Nixon – art direction
 Sheila Pree – photography

Charts

Weekly charts

Year-end charts

References

External links

Big Mike albums
1994 debut albums
Rap-A-Lot Records albums
Albums produced by N.O. Joe
Albums produced by Mike Dean (record producer)